The Maybank Numismatic Museum is a museum in Kuala Lumpur, Malaysia, that is run and owned by the Maybank. It holds one of the largest coin and money collections in Malaysia. The museum is housed in Maybank Tower at Jalan Tun Perak. In September 2012, the museum was closed to the public for renovations, and has subsequently been reopened.

Transportation
The museum is accessible within walking distance north west of Plaza Rakyat LRT Station of RapidKL.

See also
 List of museums in Malaysia

References

External links
 Virtual Malaysia | Maybank Numismatic Museum
 Museums of Malaysia | Maybank Numismatic Museum

Museums in Kuala Lumpur
Numismatic museums in Asia
Maybank